In mathematics, an abelian group, also called a commutative group, is a group in which the result of applying the group operation to two group elements does not depend on the order in which they are written. That is, the group operation is commutative. With addition as an operation, the integers and the real numbers form abelian groups, and the concept of an abelian group may be viewed as a generalization of these examples. Abelian groups are named after early 19th century mathematician Niels Henrik Abel.

The concept of an abelian group underlies many fundamental algebraic structures, such as fields, rings, vector spaces, and algebras. The theory of abelian groups is generally simpler than that of their non-abelian counterparts, and finite abelian groups are very well understood and fully classified.

Definition 
The symbol  is a general placeholder for a concretely given operation.

Inverse element For each  in  there exists an element  in  such that , where  is the identity element.

A group in which the group operation is not commutative is called a "non-abelian group" or "non-commutative group".

Facts

Notation 

There are two main notational conventions for abelian groups – additive and multiplicative.

Generally, the multiplicative notation is the usual notation for groups, while the additive notation is the usual notation for modules and rings. The additive notation may also be used to emphasize that a particular group is abelian, whenever both abelian and non-abelian groups are considered, some notable exceptions being near-rings and partially ordered groups, where an operation is written additively even when non-abelian.

Multiplication table 
To verify that a finite group is abelian, a table (matrix) – known as a Cayley table – can be constructed in a similar fashion to a multiplication table. If the group is  under the  the  entry of this table contains the product .

The group is abelian if and only if this table is symmetric about the main diagonal. This is true since the group is abelian iff  for all , which is iff the  entry of the table equals the  entry for all , i.e. the table is symmetric about the main diagonal.

Examples 
Thus the integers, form an abelian group under addition, as do the integers modulo , .
 Every ring is an abelian group with respect to its addition operation. In a commutative ring the invertible elements, or units, form an abelian multiplicative group. In particular, the real numbers are an abelian group under addition, and the nonzero real numbers are an abelian group under multiplication.
 Every subgroup of an abelian group is normal, so each subgroup gives rise to a quotient group. Subgroups, quotients, and direct sums of abelian groups are again abelian. The finite simple abelian groups are exactly the cyclic groups of prime order.
 The concepts of abelian group and -module agree.  More specifically, every -module is an abelian group with its operation of addition, and every abelian group is a module over the ring of integers  in a unique way.

In general, matrices, even invertible matrices, do not form an abelian group under multiplication because matrix multiplication is generally not commutative. However, some groups of matrices are abelian groups under matrix multiplication – one example is the group of  rotation matrices.

Historical remarks 

Camille Jordan named abelian groups after Norwegian mathematician Niels Henrik Abel, because Abel found that the commutativity of the group of a polynomial implies that the roots of the polynomial can be calculated by using radicals.

Properties 
In this way,  becomes a module over the ring  of integers. In fact, the modules over  can be identified with the abelian groups.

Theorems about abelian groups (i.e. modules over the principal ideal domain ) can often be generalized to theorems about modules over an arbitrary principal ideal domain. A typical example is the classification of finitely generated abelian groups which is a specialization of the structure theorem for finitely generated modules over a principal ideal domain. In the case of finitely generated abelian groups, this theorem guarantees that an abelian group splits as a direct sum of a torsion group and a free abelian group.

(This is not true if  is a non-abelian group.)

Somewhat akin to the dimension of vector spaces, every abelian group has a rank. It is defined as the maximal cardinality of a set of linearly independent (over the integers) elements of the group. Finite abelian groups and torsion groups have rank zero, and every abelian group of rank zero is a torsion group. The integers and the rational numbers have rank one, as well as every nonzero additive subgroup of the rationals. On the other hand, the multiplicative group of the nonzero rationals has an infinite rank, as it is a free abelian group with the set of the prime numbers as a basis (this results from the fundamental theorem of arithmetic).

A group  is abelian if and only if it is equal to its center . If the quotient group  of a group by its center is cyclic then  is abelian.

Finite abelian groups 
It turns out that an arbitrary finite abelian group is isomorphic to a direct sum of finite cyclic groups of prime power order, and these orders are uniquely determined, forming a complete system of invariants. The automorphism group of a finite abelian group can be described directly in terms of these invariants. The theory had been first developed in the 1879 paper of Georg Frobenius and Ludwig Stickelberger and later was both simplified and generalized to finitely generated modules over a principal ideal domain, forming an important chapter of linear algebra.

Any group of prime order is isomorphic to a cyclic group and therefore abelian. Any group whose order is a square of a prime number is also abelian.

Classification 
The fundamental theorem of finite abelian groups states that every finite abelian group  can be expressed as the direct sum of cyclic subgroups of prime-power order; it is also known as the basis theorem for finite abelian groups. Moreover, automorphism groups of cyclic groups are examples of abelian groups. This is generalized by the fundamental theorem of finitely generated abelian groups, with finite groups being the special case when G has zero rank; this in turn admits numerous further generalizations.

The classification was proven by Leopold Kronecker in 1870, though it was not stated in modern group-theoretic terms until later, and was preceded by a similar classification of quadratic forms by Carl Friedrich Gauss in 1801; see history for details.

It follows that any finite abelian group  is isomorphic to a direct sum of the form

in either of the following canonical ways:
 the numbers  are powers of (not necessarily distinct) primes,

For example,  can be expressed as the direct sum of two cyclic subgroups of order 3 and 5: . The same can be said for any abelian group of order 15, leading to the remarkable conclusion that all abelian groups of order 15 are isomorphic.

See also list of small groups for finite abelian groups of order 30 or less.

Automorphisms 
One can apply the fundamental theorem to count (and sometimes determine) the automorphisms of a given finite abelian group . To do this, one uses the fact that if  splits as a direct sum  of subgroups of coprime order, then

Given this, the fundamental theorem shows that to compute the automorphism group of  it suffices to compute the automorphism groups of the Sylow -subgroups separately (that is, all direct sums of cyclic subgroups, each with order a power of ). Fix a prime  and suppose the exponents  of the cyclic factors of the Sylow -subgroup are arranged in increasing order:

One needs to find the automorphisms of

One special case is when , so that there is only one cyclic prime-power factor in the Sylow -subgroup . In this case the theory of automorphisms of a finite cyclic group can be used. Here, one is considering  to be of the form

so elements of this subgroup can be viewed as comprising a vector space of dimension  over the finite field of  elements . The automorphisms of this subgroup are therefore given by the invertible linear transformations, so

where  is the appropriate general linear group. This is easily shown to have order

It is known, however, that if one defines

and

One can check that this yields the orders in the previous examples as special cases (see Hillar, C., & Rhea, D.).

Finitely generated abelian groups

Let  be a free abelian group with basis  
There is a unique group homomorphism
 such that 

This homomorphism is surjective, and its kernel is finitely generated (since integers form a Noetherian ring). Consider the matrix  with integer entries, such that the entries of its th column are the coefficients of the th generator of the kernel. Conversely every integer matrix defines a finitely generated abelian group.

It follows that the study of finitely generated abelian groups is totally equivalent with the study of integer matrices.

The existence and the shape of the Smith normal proves that the finitely generated abelian group  is the direct sum 
 
This is the fundamental theorem of finitely generated abelian groups.

The existence of algorithms for Smith normal form shows that the fundamental theorem of finitely generated abelian groups is not only a theorem of abstract existence, but provides a way for computing expression of finitely generated abelian groups as direct sums.

Infinite abelian groups 
The simplest infinite abelian group is the infinite cyclic group .

By contrast, classification of general infinitely generated abelian groups is far from complete. Moreover, if a divisible group  is a subgroup of an abelian group  then  admits a direct complement: a subgroup  of  such that . Thus divisible groups are injective modules in the category of abelian groups, and conversely, every injective abelian group is divisible (Baer's criterion). An abelian group without non-zero divisible subgroups is called reduced.

Torsion groups 

An abelian group is called periodic or torsion, if every element has finite order. A direct sum of finite cyclic groups is periodic. Although the converse statement is not true in general, some special cases are known.
These theorems were later subsumed in the Kulikov criterion. In a different direction, Helmut Ulm found an extension of the second Prüfer theorem to countable abelian -groups with elements of infinite height: those groups are completely classified by means of their Ulm invariants.

Torsion-free and mixed groups 

An abelian group is called torsion-free if every non-zero element has infinite order. Several classes of torsion-free abelian groups have been studied extensively:

 Free abelian groups, i.e. arbitrary direct sums of 
 Cotorsion and algebraically compact torsion-free groups such as the -adic integers
 Slender groups

An abelian group that is neither periodic nor torsion-free is called mixed. Thus the theory of mixed groups involves more than simply combining the results about periodic and torsion-free groups. The additive group  of integers is torsion-free -module.

Invariants and classification 
On the other hand, the group of -adic integers  is a torsion-free abelian group of infinite -rank and the groups  with different  are non-isomorphic, so this invariant does not even fully capture properties of some familiar groups.

The classification theorems for finitely generated, divisible, countable periodic, and rank 1 torsion-free abelian groups explained above were all obtained before 1950 and form a foundation of the classification of more general infinite abelian groups. Important technical tools used in classification of infinite abelian groups are pure and basic subgroups. Introduction of various invariants of torsion-free abelian groups has been one avenue of further progress. See the books by Irving Kaplansky, László Fuchs, Phillip Griffith, and David Arnold, as well as the proceedings of the conferences on Abelian Group Theory published in Lecture Notes in Mathematics for more recent findings.

Additive groups of rings 
The additive group of a ring is an abelian group, but not all abelian groups are additive groups of rings (with nontrivial multiplication). Some important topics in this area of study are:

 Tensor product
 A.L.S. Corner's results on countable torsion-free groups
 Shelah's work to remove cardinality restrictions
 Burnside ring

Relation to other mathematical topics 
Many large abelian groups possess a natural topology, which turns them into topological groups.

The collection of all abelian groups, together with the homomorphisms between them, forms the category , the prototype of an abelian category.

 proved that the first-order theory of abelian groups, unlike its non-abelian counterpart, is decidable. Most algebraic structures other than Boolean algebras are undecidable.

There are still many areas of current research:
Amongst torsion-free abelian groups of finite rank, only the finitely generated case and the rank 1 case are well understood;
There are many unsolved problems in the theory of infinite-rank torsion-free abelian groups;
While countable torsion abelian groups are well understood through simple presentations and Ulm invariants, the case of countable mixed groups is much less mature.
Many mild extensions of the first-order theory of abelian groups are known to be undecidable.
Finite abelian groups remain a topic of research in computational group theory.

Moreover, abelian groups of infinite order lead, quite surprisingly, to deep questions about the set theory commonly assumed to underlie all of mathematics. Take the Whitehead problem: are all Whitehead groups of infinite order also free abelian groups? In the 1970s, Saharon Shelah proved that the Whitehead problem is:
 Undecidable in ZFC (Zermelo–Fraenkel axioms), the conventional axiomatic set theory from which nearly all of present-day mathematics can be derived. The Whitehead problem is also the first question in ordinary mathematics proved undecidable in ZFC;
 Undecidable even if ZFC is augmented by taking the generalized continuum hypothesis as an axiom;
 Positively answered if ZFC is augmented with the axiom of constructibility (see statements true in L).

A note on typography 
Among mathematical adjectives derived from the proper name of a mathematician, the word "abelian" is rare in that it is often spelled with a lowercase a, rather than an uppercase A, the lack of capitalization being a tacit acknowledgment not only of the degree to which Abel's name has been institutionalized but also of how ubiquitous in modern mathematics are the concepts introduced by him.

See also 

, the smallest non-abelian group

Notes

References 
 
 
 
 
 
 
 
  Unabridged and unaltered republication of a work first published by the Cambridge University Press, Cambridge, England, in 1978.

External links
 

Abelian group theory
Properties of groups
Niels Henrik Abel